Hellinsia pallens is a moth of the family Pterophoridae. It is found in Ecuador.

Adults are on wing in May, at an altitude of 1,300 m.

References

Moths described in 2011
pallens
Moths of South America